Piz Medel is a mountain in the Lepontine Alps, located on the border between the cantons of Ticino and Graubünden. The mountain overlooks the Greina, an important pass connecting the cantons of Graubünden and Ticino.

The northern side of the massif (Graubünden) is covered by a large glacier named Glatscher da Medel, separated on its lower part in three branches. The massif consists of several summits among which the highest are Piz a Spescha (3,109 metres), Piz Cristallina (3,128 metres), Piz Uffiern (3,151 metres) and Cima di Camadra (3,172 metres).

The normal route to the summit starts at Fuorcla da Lavaz (2,524 metres), a pass connecting the northern valleys of Medel and Sumvitg. A hut has been erected on the pass by the Swiss Alpine Club, the Medel hut.

See also
List of mountains of Graubünden
List of mountains of Ticino
List of most isolated mountains of Switzerland

References

External links

Piz Medel on Summitpost
Piz Medel on Hikr
Medel hut (German)

Mountains of Switzerland
Mountains of Graubünden
Mountains of Ticino
Mountains of the Alps
Alpine three-thousanders
Graubünden–Ticino border
Lepontine Alps
Medel (Lucmagn)